The Combat Vehicle 90 (CV90),  (Strf 90), is a family of Swedish tracked armored combat vehicles designed by Sweden's Defence Materiel Administration (Försvarets Materielverk, FMV), Hägglunds and Bofors during the mid-1980s to early 1990s, entering service in Sweden in the mid-1990s. The CV90 platform design has continuously evolved from the Mk 0 to current Mk IV with technological advances and changing battlefield requirements. The Swedish version of the main infantry fighting vehicle (IFV) is fitted with a turret from Bofors equipped with a 40 mm Bofors autocannon. Export versions are fitted with Hägglunds E-series turrets, armed with either a 30 mm Mk44 or a 35 mm Bushmaster autocannon.

Developed specifically for the Nordic subarctic climate, the vehicle has very good mobility in snow and wetlands while carrying and supporting eight, and in later versions six, fully equipped soldiers. Other variants include forward artillery observation, command and control, anti-aircraft, armoured recovery vehicle, electronic warfare versions and so forth. Currently, 1,280 vehicles in 15 variants are in service with seven user states, four of which are part of the NATO alliance, under contract with BAE Systems Hägglunds AB.

History 
During the Cold War, in 1983, the Swedish Army required vehicles with high mobility, air defence and anti-tank capability, high survivability and protection. In 1985, the "Stridsfordon 90" project group, made up of representatives from the Swedish armed forces (Försvarsmakten), the FMV and Swedish industry (including Hägglunds and Bofors), finalized the design for a "unity vehicle" that originated from an air force concept. In 1986, the prototypes for Strf 9040 and Strf 9025 were ordered. Five prototypes were constructed but, before delivery in 1988, the 9025 version was discontinued. The prototypes were tested during extensive trials between 1988 and 1991, during which prototypes for specialized variants (forward observation, command and control, and armoured recovery vehicles) were ordered. The first deliveries started in 1994.

The CV90 has undergone four mark shifts to meet different customer requirements, focusing on capability enhancements.

CV90 Mk 0

The first CV90 delivered (retroactively named mark 0) was for Sweden, and was armed with a Bofors 40/70B cannon (a dedicated AFV variant of the Bofors 40 mm Automatic Gun L/70) in a two-man turret, which had beaten out the M242 Bushmaster 25 mm chain gun during initial prototype-trials. The Mk 0 has a conventional electrical system and was fitted for but not with appliqué armour systems. The Swedish Army ordered five variants of the CV90. The requirements expressed by the Swedish FMV on signature management were extremely challenging and led to a lot of new design features inherited by all subsequent generations (Mks 0 to III). FMV also prioritized the requirements to provide the best possible design to fulfil user needs. Furthermore, the CV90 was also built for high reliability and ease of maintenance using only standard on-board tools and for conscripts to maintain and operate.

CV90 Mk I

The next variant of CV90, known as the Mk I, was delivered to Norway after winning the country's competition for a new IFV against contemporaries such as the American M2 Bradley, British FV510 Warrior, and Austro-Spanish ASCOD (Pizarro/ULAN). The Mk I variant of the CV90 had a newly designed two-man 30 mm turret, evolved from the 25 mm turret. CV90 Mk I was the first IFV with high-hit probability performance during suppression fire modes, both while the vehicle is on the move and against air targets. The CV90 Mk I incorporated several improvements over the original Swedish CV90. Evaluations of mobility, reliability, lethality, fightability, ergonomics, durability and survivability were performed during the CV90 Mk I trial phase for these vehicles, with good results.

CV90 Mk II

The CV90 Mk I was the base for the next development, the CV90 Mk II. The Mk II was produced in three variants: the CV9030 CH (Switzerland) IFV and COM, and the CV9030 FIN (Finland) IFV. Both contracts were won in competition against other IFVs. One significant difference between the two variants was hull size: the Swiss variant is 100 mm higher over the front, with an additional 70 mm over the combat compartment at the rear. Another difference is the Mk II's partial digitization and built-in Health & Unit Monitoring System (HUMS), along with interactive manuals and instructions. The CV90 Mk II's standard armament is the Mk44 Bushmaster II autocannon.

CV90 Mk III

The Mk III variant of the CV90 is a further development of the CV90 Mk II. The areas that underwent the most development were lethality, fightability, electronic architecture, survivability and mobility. The weapon system was upgraded to a 35/50 mm Bushmaster III cannon with an integrated muzzle ammunition programmer and a number of different firing scenarios depending on target setup. The crew station design provides the gunner and commander with a continuous eye-on-target engagement feature (crew members do not need to remove their head from the eyepiece to see and operate equipment).

Further electronic architecture upgrades made the Mk III completely digitized. Mobility improvements consisted of upgraded suspension and enhanced power-to-weight ratio to handle the increased gross vehicle weight. Improved survivability mainly came in the areas of mine protection and top attack. Horizontal protection was designed in similar ways to other CV90 variants, i.e. appliqué systems. The first variant of the Mk III, the Mk IIIa, was delivered to the Netherlands and Denmark, and the second, more modern Mk IIIb variant was delivered to Norway.

CV90 Mk IV
Its maximum weight was increased from 35 to 37 tonnes, with space for two tonnes of additional payload, without a decrease in vehicle agility. It features a new augmented reality system named iFighting. The iFighting concept fuses data from different systems within the vehicle to filter and prioritize the most critical information, allowing quicker crew decision-making and improved battlefield performance. The Mk IV generation will also be the first Western IFV with a qualified Active Protection System. It will be equipped with fourth generation electronic architecture supporting future technology adoption and growth.

CV90 Mk V: 
The Swedish army is supporting the development of an improved variant from between 2023 and 2027. No agreement has yet been concluded between the FMV and the industry on that development. The development goals focus on:

 A hybrid electric propulsion system will be proposed and potentially integrated to this version
 The C4ISR system is to be fully digitalized
 Improvement of the heat, radar and visual signature management of the vehicle
 Integrate Beyond Line Of Sight anti-tank guided missiles. The Akeron MP is the next long range shoulder launched anti-tank missile, and it has a BLOS capability.
 Integration of UAVThis variant might be ordered, and it would extend the life time of the CV90 in the Swedish Army beyond 2034. An upgrade of the Strf variant (IFV) including some of these elements is very likely.  Initial tests involving the use of the Akeron MP and of a UAV has been performed in January 2023.

Design 
Varying customer requirements have led to multiple CV90 variants with major differences in survivability and electronic architecture. Increased protection has led to higher curb weight; the vehicle's combat weight has risen from 23 to 35 tonnes. With increasingly powerful diesel engines, the power-to-weight ratio has remained approximately the same. The track suspension system has seen several successive upgrades.

The Mk III version has a digital electronic architecture with several different CAN-buses and digital networks, and is the first IFV incorporating an automatic defensive aide suite which classifies threats and, in automatic mode, can fire smoke and/or the main gun to eliminate or evade targets, as well as instruct the driver on potential threats. At the Eurosatory 2010 exhibition, a version called Armadillo was presented. The Armadillo shown was an armoured personnel carrier (APC) version. The basic chassis can be readily converted to ambulance, control vehicle or other turreted versions.

Protection 
The CV9040's basic armour provides all-round protection against 14.5 mm armour-piercing rounds. Armour protection over the frontal arc is classified, but all models from CV9040B onwards are said to be protected against 30 mm APFSDS. Some variants, including the CV9030N, can be fitted with MEXAS, a ceramic appliqué armor that provides protection against 30 mm APFSDS. This armour kit is intended to provide increased protection against improvised explosive devices, explosively formed penetrators, and 30 mm caliber armour-piercing rounds. All CV90s are fitted with a spall liner, which covers the interior spaces and provides protection for the troops inside against shrapnel and anti-personnel artillery munitions.

The CV90 can be also fitted with cage armour, which provides protection against tandem-charge and shaped charge warheads. The CV90 is fitted with a nuclear, biological, and chemical (NBC) filtration system accompanied by a chemical detector and radiation detector systems. The CV90 also uses heat-absorbing filters to provide temporary protection against thermal imaging (TIS), image intensifiers and infrared cameras (IR). The CV90 was designed with a very low and compact structure to minimize radar and IR signatures.

With every generation of CV90 there has been an increase in payload and corresponding protection levels. The inherent mine protection levels have risen substantially to presently defeat the heaviest (10 kg TNT) anti-tank mines.

In December 2016, BAE Systems received a contract from the Netherlands to test the Israel Military Industries (IMI) Iron Fist active protection system on their CV9035 vehicles. Iron Fist employs a multi-sensor early warning system using both infrared and radar sensors to deploy soft- and hard-kill countermeasures against anti-tank rockets and missiles. A decision for integration was to be made by early 2018.

In 2011, Hägglunds (now BAE Systems AB) demonstrated a version with an infrared camouflage called Adaptiv, consisting of thermoelectric plates capable of posing as many different objects, such as ordinary cars, stones, trees etc. to an enemy IR-viewfinder. It takes 1,500 plates to cover a CV90, at a cost of $100 per plate.

Mobility 
The CV90 offers quiet movement for improved stealth, high speed over good terrain, and high ground clearance for protection against mines and improvised explosive devices.

BAE Systems is considering upgrading the CV90 with a hybrid-electric propulsion system as armies look to cut fuel expenses to respond to environmental issues and fuel economy. A hybrid-electric drive could cut fuel consumption by 10 to 30 percent. The new system would also provide a power boost to move the vehicle. The hybrid-electric combines a standard diesel engine with a battery pack to provide extra power to propel the vehicle or provide additional electricity. BAE Systems Hägglunds uses the knowledge acquired through many years of hybrid-electric drive development for the military SEP vehicles and the ongoing civilian hybrid-electric projects for forest machines, airplane howlers and loaders.

In April 2015, BAE Systems fitted a CV90 with an active damping suspension system derived from Formula One racing cars. This technology calculates the vehicle's speed and anticipates the terrain ahead, then pressurizes the suspension at independent points to lift the chassis and keep the vehicle level. The suspension, which had been modified to suit a 38-ton armored vehicle rather than the  racing car, reportedly increases speed by 30-40 percent on rough terrain, outrunning main battle tanks, decreases vehicle pitch acceleration by 40 percent, gives greater maneuverability and stability for on-the-move gunnery, and reduces crew fatigue and life-cycle costs.

Armament 

The basic Swedish CV90 (Strf 9040) is fitted with a two-man turret armed with a Bofors 40/70B autocannon and a coaxial 7.62 mm machine gun. The CV90 also carries six 76-mm grenade launchers, which are arranged in two clusters of three launchers; the clusters are positioned on each side of the turret. The grenade launchers are intended for smoke grenades, but can also be loaded with a variety of combat grenades.

The CV90 export variants are fitted with a Hagglunds E-series turret, with more than 600 E30 (30 mm Bushmaster II) and E35 (35 mm Bushmaster III) turrets delivered. BAE Systems Australia Limited presented an offer for LAND 400 Phase 3 is the CV9035 with an E35 turret. It provides high commonality with BAE Systems’ LAND 400 Phase 2 CRV offer – the AMV35 – through its use of the same E35 turret system.

Sight 
The CV90 is equipped with a UTAAS (Universal Tank and Anti-Aircraft Sight) from Saab. Daytime optical, thermal imaging System (TIS) and Generation III image intensification. The Norwegian IFV, C2, Recce, Mortar and Combat Engineer variants are delivered with the Kongsberg Protector Remote Weapon Station with 360 degrees day and night sights as well as hunter killer capability.

Production 
Production of the CV90 began in 1993, and as of 2014 over 1,200 vehicles had been ordered. In November 2000, Finland ordered 57 CV9030 vehicles. Total cost was €250 million (2008 value), or €4.42 million per vehicle. In June 2004, Finland made another purchase, bringing the overall quantity ordered to 102. This time, the cost was €2.92 million (2008 value) per vehicle. In December 2005, Denmark ordered 45 CV9035 vehicles for a cost of €188 million or €4.18 million per vehicle.

The Netherlands ordered 184 combat plus 8 instruction CV9035 vehicles for a cost of €749 million, or €3.9 million per vehicle. Norway initially bought 104 CV90s in the 1990s, buying new vehicles and upgrading the old ones in the 2010s. The Norwegian Army fields 164 CV90s, of which 74 are combat vehicles, 28 combat-engineering vehicles, 24 multi-purpose vehicles, 21 reconnaissance vehicles, 15 command vehicles, and two instruction vehicles.

Variants

Domestic 
The following versions were developed by Hägglund/Bofors in cooperation with FOA and FMV for Försvarsmakten as part of the Stridsfordon 90 (Strf 90)-family. Sweden originally planned for a mix of CV9040 and CV9025, tests of the 25 mm turret being carried out on an Ikv 91 chassis, but finally decided on the 40 mm version, due to the much higher versatility of the larger calibre.
 Stridsfordon (Strf) 9040 (SB1A3): The original model carries eight soldiers and is equipped with a 40 mm Bofors autocannon. From November 1997, the gun was gyro-stabilized. Versions are referred to by the letters A, B or C depending on upgrades. All from A onwards remain in service.
 Strf 9040: Original production version with no gun stabilization and Lyran mortar. Incremental improvements were made during production; all have been upgraded to Strf9040A standard.
 Strf 9040A: Strf 9040 upgraded with extensive chassis modifications and external gun stabilisation on turret front. It has more storage and better emergency exits, and the seats in the troop compartment were reduced to seven.
 Strf 9040B: 9040A updated with improvements to armament (new fire control software, electric firing pin, fully stabilized gun with internal stabilisation and reserve sight with video camera for the gunner), improved suspension for better accuracy and crew comfort while moving, new instrumentation and new seatbelts.
 Strf 9040B1: Strf9040B modified for international peacekeeping missions. It has a 3P ammunition programmer, climate control and anti-spall liner.
 Strf 9040C: Upgraded version for crew training and international operations. As per 9040B1 with additional all-round armour, laser filtering in all periscopes and tropical grade air conditioning. Due to the bulk and weight of the modifications, only six soldiers can be carried.
 Luftvärnskanonvagn (lvkv) 9040: self-propelled anti-aircraft gun vehicle, fitted with PS-95 radar from Thomson CSF Harfang (now Thales Group) and a high elevation 40 mm autocannon capable of using programmable ammunition. It is connected to the national air defence net LuLIS. Three have been upgraded to C-standard. There is also a demonstrator, designated Lvkv 90-TD, fitted with infrared video targeting and a fully stabilized gun for firing on the move.
 Granatkastarpansarbandvagn (Grkpbv) 90: (Tracked Armoured Mortar Vehicle), producer name Mjölner: A CV90 fitted with two 120 mm mortars. The 40 CV90 hulls for this project had already been purchased by 2003 and were originally intended to be equipped with the Patria Advanced Mortar System. For economic reasons, Genomförandegruppen recommended against it and the AMOS order was cancelled with the vehicles put in storage until BAE Systems AB received a contract in December 2016 to install Mjölner 120 mm mortars on the 40 CV90s to increase the indirect fire capability of mechanized battalions. The first units were delivered in January 2019 and all 40 vehicles had been delivered by 2020. In 2022 an additional 20 vehicles were ordered with deliveries scheduled for between 2023 to 2025. In January 2023, a new order of 20 systems was concluded, and the deliveries will be completed by 2025. These systems will get the new C4I LSS Mark artillery command and control system. The first 40 CV90 will later be upgraded to this standard. 
 Stridsledningspansarbandvagn (Stripbv) 90 (Forward Command Vehicle): Used by the battalion and brigade commander for command and control. Two were upgraded to C-standard, but have been decommissioned as of 2011.
 Eldledningspansarbandvagn (Epbv) 90 (Forward Observation Vehicle): For directing artillery and mortar fire, a more advanced IR sensor was fitted; eight have been upgraded to C-standard.
 Bärgningsbandvagn (Bgbv) 90, (Armoured Recovery Vehicle): Two 9-tonne winches provide a maximum capacity of 72 tonnes through 4-way pulleys. Three have been upgraded to C-standard, and at least one has been used in Afghanistan.

The command, forward observation and armoured recovery vehicles are armed only with a machine gun.

The following versions were not taken into Swedish army service.
 Störpansarbandvagn (Störpbv) 90 (Electronic Warfare Vehicle): A 9040A had its turret replaced with a fixed housing containing retractable mast and a LEMUR weapons station. Planned in 2002, a single unit was produced before serial production was cancelled for economic reasons and as of 2013 the project is still on hold.
 Strf 90120 / CV90120-T: Light tank demonstrator armed with CTG 120/L50 (Compact Tank Gun) developed by RUAG. The gun is 120mm smoothbore, calibre length 50, with a rate of fire of 12–14 rds/minute. 12 rounds are kept ready in the turret bustle, with a further 33 stowed in the hull rear.
 Stridsfordon 9040/56: Prototype version of the CV9040 equipped with the Bofors RB56 anti-tank missile. Issues with the sight alignment were unsolved and no units ordered.

Export versions 
The export versions of CV90 is delivered with the combat proven BAE Systems Hägglunds E-series turrets with armament ranging from 30–120mm. The vast majority of the 600 turrets delivered are fitted with 30mm or 35mm guns.

CV9030
 Export version with a 30 mm Bushmaster II autocannon. Adopted by Norway, Switzerland and Finland. Within BAE Systems Hägglunds, the original version of the Norwegian CV9030N is known as the CV90 Mk I. The Finnish CV9030FIN and Swiss CV9030CH vehicles are known as the CV90 Mk II. The CV90 Mk II is also available as CV9030 COM – Command & Control Vehicle. The recently upgraded CV9030N infantry fighting, command and control and reconnaissance vehicles for Norway are known as CV90 Mk IIIb, and this is the most advanced variant currently in service.
CV9035
 Armed with a Bushmaster III 35/50 cannon. Adopted by the Netherlands as CV9035NL and Denmark as CV9035DK. Within BAE Systems Hägglunds, CV9035 is known as the CV90 Mk III.
CV90105
 Light tank equipped with 105 mm rifled tank gun/turret. Designed by Hägglunds (BAE Systems) and GIAT (Nexter). A newer version features the Cockerill XC-8 turret.
CV90120-T
 Light tank equipped with a tank turret equipped with a smoothbore 120 mm gun. (RUAG 120 mm Compact Tank Gun)
CV90 CZ
 Export variant designed in collaboration with VOP CZ marketed to the Czech Republic, manned turret variant.
CV90 CZr
 Export variant designed in collaboration with VOP CZ marketed to the Czech Republic featuring a Kongsberg MCT-30 unmanned, remote controlled turret, a slightly raised hull and periscope system.
Armadillo
 Armoured personnel carrier version built on a modular CV90 Mk III chassis. The CV90 Armadillo can be modified to become a personnel carrier, an ambulance, a command and control centre, a recovery vehicle and many other non-turreted variants at low cost due up to 80% commonality among variants. Currently, only the APC version has been built, with five delivered to Denmark for trials.
CV90RWS STING
 Combat engineering variant built on CV90 Mk I chassis. This vehicle can be outfitted with either a mine plow or a mine roller, and it also has a robotic arm. 28 have been ordered by the Norwegian Army.
CV90RWS Multi BK
 Mortar carrier variant built on a CV90 Mk I chassis. This vehicle is armed with a VingPos Mortar Weapon System outfitted with an 81mm L16A2 mortar. 24 have been ordered by the Norwegian Army.
CV90 Mk IV
 BAE-developed upgraded variant revealed in January 2018, marketed to the Czech Republic as well as existing customers as an upgrade package. Features include a Scania engine with up to 1000 horsepower, Perkins X300 transmission, and an increased payload of 2 tonnes. The system also includes BAE's iFighting computer system, which claims to enhance situational awareness, aid decision making, improve ergonomics, and enable autonomous support and remote operation.
CV9035NL MLU
 On 13 January 2021, the Defence Materiel Organisation (DMO) of the Netherlands Armed Forces signed a contract with BAE Systems Hägglunds for a mid-life update of 128 CV90s of the Royal Netherlands Army, with an option for 19 further vehicles. The MLU project features a wide range of modernisations and improvements. The turret has been completely redesigned and will feature a new main gun installation, a mast-mounted 500mm extendable electro-optical sensor, Elbit Systems’ Iron Fist LD (Light Decoupled) active protection system, FN MAG general-purpose machine gun in an external pod and a twin missile launcher for Spike LRII anti-tank guided missiles. Furthermore, the CV90s will be equipped with rubber tracks, upgraded cooling, various cyber-security improvements and updated command and control infrastructure. Construction of the new turrets will be conducted by Dutch firm Van Halteren Defence.

Combat service 

First use was by the Swedish UN forces in Liberia 2004, where 13 Stridsfordon 9040C were deployed.

Since production began in 1993, the CV90 had remained untested in combat until November 2007, when Norwegian Army CV90s from the 2nd Battalion saw heavy combat during Operation Harekate Yolo in Afghanistan. During the first week of November, Norwegian ISAF forces from the 2nd Battalion and Kystjegerkommandoen based in Mazar-e-Sharif, responded to a Taliban attack on Afghan National Army forces in the Ghowrmach district. Having been heavily outnumbered by the Taliban forces, the Norwegians used mortars and, in particular, CV90s, to suppress the attack. The operation left an unknown number of Taliban casualties, but Norwegian news sources say as many as 45 to 65 Taliban fighters may have been killed, and many more wounded.

The CV90 was later used extensively by ISAF forces of the Norwegian Army's Telemark Battalion in May 2008, when the battalion came under heavy machine gun and RPG fire from Taliban fighters during Operation Karez in Badghis Province. The attack left 13 Taliban fighters dead and an unknown number wounded. No allied casualties were reported. In January 2010, a Norwegian soldier was killed when a CV9030 hit a large IED (improvised explosive device) in Ghowrmach, Afghanistan.

In February 2010, Denmark sent ten CV9035DKs to Afghanistan in order to bolster their contingent in Helmand Province. The Danish contingent had suffered numerous casualties since they began operations in the province in the autumn of 2006. The vehicles are from the Danish Royal Lifeguard Regiment, based in the Northern part of Seeland. They are working alongside MOWAG Piranha IIIC, MOWAG Eagle IV, M113 G3DK and Leopard 2A5DK vehicles, all contributed by Denmark, in the Helmand Province. By April 2010, two of the ten vehicles had been hit with IEDs, in both cases protecting the crew and passengers from personal injury. The vehicles lost two wheels and tracks, and were sent back to the manufacturer in Sweden for further investigation. On 7 August 2010, a CV9035DK hit an IED in Afghanistan, killing two soldiers and wounding another three. The explosion was so powerful that the vehicle was turned over.

On 19 January 2023, the Swedish Prime Minister announced the transfer of up to 50 CV90s to Ukraine to aid against the Russian invasion of the country.

Operators

Current operators 
 : 45 CV9035DKs. 10 have been upgraded to international operations.
 : 44 CV9035NLs purchased from the Netherlands in December 2014, and now referred to as CV9035EE. The first delivery took place in 2016. That same year, Estonia struck a deal with Norway to purchase an additional 35 surplus Mk I hulls. Deliveries from the Netherlands were completed on 1 April 2019.
 : 102 CV9030FINs (57 first batch, 45 second batch), which are unique in that they are equipped with a coaxial PKMT machine gun.
 : 193 CV9035NLs (initial order of 184 vehicles raised to 193). Deliveries were completed in 2011. In December 2014, 44 CV9035NL were sold to Estonia.
 : 164 (ordered) CV90s (all variants). 104 CV9030Ns were purchased in 1994. 17 of these were later upgraded with air conditioning, additional mine protection, and rear-view cameras, and were designated CV9030NF1. In April 2012, the Norwegian government proposed to upgrade all CV90s in the Norwegian Army's inventory, in addition to acquiring more vehicles. In June 2012, a deal was signed with BAE Systems Hägglunds and Kongsberg Defence & Aerospace for the acquisition of 144 new/upgraded vehicles, including 74 infantry fighting, 21 reconnaissance, 15 command, 16 engineering, 16 multi-role and two driver training vehicles. On February 18, 2021, it was announced that Norway had ordered another 12 combat engineering vehicles and 8 multi-role vehicles.
 : 549 vehicles, including 42 CV9040C with additional armour. In February 2022 and in January 2023, the Swedish Army ordered a batch of additional 20+20 CV90 Mjölner mortar systems.
 : 186 CV9030CHs.

Future operators 

 : The Slovak military decided to purchase 152 CV90 Mk IVs in June 2022 following their evaluation of several different infantry fighting vehicles and the contract worth €1.3 billion was signed on 12 December 2022. The contract includes 122 IFV variants armed with a 35mm autocannon and SPIKE-LR anti-tank guided missiles, as well as the Iron Fist active protection system. Other variants ordered by the Slovak army include command and control, engineering and recovery vehicles based on the CV90 
 : On 20 July 2022, the Czech government announced that Defence Minister Jana Černochová was authorised to begin negotiations with the Swedish government for the procurement of CV90 Mk IV infantry fighting vehicles. It was also revealed that the previous tender for new infantry fighting vehicles had been cancelled, as two of the three suppliers (Rheinmetall - Lynx KF41 & GDELS - ASCOD 42) declined to accept new terms and conditions for the tender. While the number of vehicles to be procured wasn't officially stated during the announcement, the cancelled tender was for 210 IFVs. Negotiations for the new infantry fighting vehicles were to be coordinated with Slovakia, which had also recently selected the CV90 Mk IV.
 : Sweden will donate 51 CV90s of undefined variants to Ukraine as part of its support to counter the Russian invasion.

Evaluation-only operators 

 : 1 CV9035 Mark III. A combination of budget cuts and upgrades to the existing fleet of LAV IIIs led the Canadian Army to cancel the procurement of light combat vehicles, in which BAE Systems Hägglunds was offering its CV90.
  Poland: the CV90120T was on trials in 2007 and later rebuilt into the PL-01.
 : competed with Scout SV as part of Future Rapid Effect System.
 : The CV90 was a contender for the US Army's Next-Generation Combat Vehicle program.

Specifications of variants (domestic)

See also 
 Lynx
 ASCOD
 Bionix
 BMP-3
 BTR-4
 Dardo
 K21
 M2 Bradley
 Puma
 Type 89
 Ajax
 Makran
 Tulpar (IFV)

References

External links 

 Combat Vehicle 90 in Army Technology 
 BAE Systems CV90
 SoldF.com – CV9040 
 Armada International 6/97-52 Information on the Norwegian IFV trials and changes found in the Norwegian CV9030 
 Danish CV9035 Mk III 

Armoured personnel carriers of Sweden
Infantry fighting vehicles of the post–Cold War period
Tracked infantry fighting vehicles
Military vehicles introduced in the 1990s